Ernest Seraphin Schweninger (September 9, 1892 – November 11, 1957), also known as Ernie, was a popular actor and grocer in Carmel-by-the-Sea, California. His parents built the Schweninger Building in 1906, known today as the Carmel Bakery. Schweninger was founder and charter member of the Carmel American Legion Post No. 512. He was the owner of the Schweninger's Grocery and first Carmel Bakery on Ocean Avenue. He appeared in many of the early plays at the Forest Theater and Theatre of the Golden Bough. He became a partner and sales manager for the Carmel Land Company that helped develop Hatton Fields, southeast of Carmel-by-the-Sea.

Early life 

Schweninger was born on September 9, 1892, in San Jose, California. His father was Fritz Seraphin Schweninger (1867-1918) who was born in Germany and immigrated to San Francisco in 1886; and mother was Helen M. Harmon (1869-1918) from Maine. He had one brother, George  Washington Schweninger (1894-1956).

After the 1906 San Francesco earthquake, when Ernest was 13 years old, his parents moved from San Jose to Carmel to open the first bakery on the south side of Ocean Avenue halfway between Dolores and Lincoln Streets. His father, Fritz, was friends with pioneer real estate developer Frank Devendorf.

Schweninger was an eighth grade graduate in the Monterey School on June 30, 1906. He was the first boy from Carmel to attend the Monterey High School. During his high school commencement exercises, he appeared in the senior play, She Stoops to Conquer.

Schweninger went to the University of California, Berkeley (1912-1915). He was a member of the Sigma Phi Epsilon fraternity at Berkeley and graduated as a senior in the class of 1914.

Professional background

In 1915, Schweningers parents acquired two lots adjacent to the Carmel Bakery, on Ocean Avenue, and opened the Carmel Grocery store. Ernest worked in the grocery store and offered free auto deliveries. On August 2, 1916, Schweninger voted in the petition to incorporate the city of Carmel-by-the-Sea.

The bakery was successful, but in September 1917, the Schweningers announced they would close the business to spend more time with the grocery business. The bakery sat vacant throughout 1918-1919.

On May 1, 1918, during World War I, Schweninger was recruited at the  Fort McDowell on Angle Island in San Francisco and was stationed with the United States Navy at Mare Island. While serving in the Navy, both his parents died in an automobile accident at the summit of Carmel Hill on May 17, 1918. A Memorial service was held at the All Saints Church in Monterey. Because Ernest was away serving in the war, his brother George was appointed administrator of the estate of his parents by the Superior Court. The estate was valued at $20,000. After the war, in January 1919, Schweninger was relieved from active duty and returned home and took over running the grocery store. In 1920, he reopened the Carmel Bakery leasing the building to Carl Husemann. The building was leased to several other people who ran the bakery.

In 1921, Schweninger helped launch the Abalone League an amateur baseball and softball club. The founders of the league and first board of directors were Schweninger, Byington Ford, James Doud, Talbert Josselyn, and Frank Sheridan. The articles of incorporation stated that the "Abalone League is a cooperative association organized for the purpose of fostering athletics, particularly baseball, and to provide for the physical benefit of Carmel's citizenry." As a corporation, the league was able to sell certificates of membership.

In 1923, the Schweninger brothers sold the grocery store business to Benjamin F. Minges of Monterey, who operated it for 14 years. He kept the land and leased the bakery and grocery store buildings. Now with time on his hands, Schweninger applied for a US Passport for his travels to the South Seas on May 21, 1923. He was described as 30 years old, 5 feet, 8 inches; writer, with a mole on his right cheek. He traveled with his close friends, writers Harry Leon Wilson and his wife Helen and Charles King Van Riper and his wife Helen. Van Riper identified that he had known Schweninger for five years in Carmel-by-the-Sea. They visited New Zealand, Society Islands, Australia, and Tahiti on board the SS Maunganui. They also visited Japan after the 1923 Great Kantō earthquake.

Schweninger was a founder and charter member of the Carmel American Legion Post No. 512 in 1934. It was a veterans' organization and historic meeting hall located at the corner of Dolores Street and 8th Avenue.

On July 5, 1949, Schweninger, age 56, married Carol Walker (1899-1989) in Reno, Nevada. She had two sons from a previous marriage and had come to Carmel-by-the-Sea in 1940.

Acting

Schweninger appeared in many of the early Forest Theater and Theatre of the Golden Bough plays. He and his brother George appeared in the first theatrical production of David, written by Constance Lindsay Skinner under the direction of Garnet Holme of Berkeley, at the Forest Theater on July 9, 1910. The play was reviewed in both Los Angeles and San Francisco and was reported that nearly 1,000 theatergoers attended the production.

Schweninger acted in plays with Herbert Heron at the Forest Theater. He was in Heron's comedy play Immortal Fame on February 26, 1915, sponsored by the Carmel Arts and Crafts Club.

In 1917, Ernest acted in two summer plays, Androcles and the Lion, where he played the Captain, and A Thousand Years Ago by Percy MacKaye, where he played Calaf, Prince of Astrakhan.

Carmel Land Company

In 1925, Schweninger became the sales manager for the Carmel Land Company and helped develop Hatton Fields, southeast of Carmel-by-the-Sea. The new company formed an office on Ocean Avenue between Louis S. Slevin's general merchandise store and the Carmel Bakery. Paul Aiken Flanders was president, Schweninger was secretary, and Peter Mawdsley was the treasurer.

The first to purchase land was director Perry Newberry. In August 1939, the company sold , of the old Hatton Ranch, for $31,000 for the proposed Carmel High School.

In 1947, the Carmel Land Company was sold to C. A. Fuller's Carmel Company. Schweninger continued as sales manager with the new company.

Death

Schweninger died of a heart attack at his home in Carmel-by-the-Sea, on Veteran's Day, November 11, 1957, at the age of 65. He is survived by his wife Carol and two stepsons. Funeral services were held in the Little Chapel-by-the-Sea and interment was at the El Carmelo Cemetery, in Pacific Grove, California.

List of Plays

See also

 Timeline of Carmel-by-the-Sea, California

References

  

1892 births
1957 deaths
People from California
People from Carmel-by-the-Sea, California